Kalantar is a daily Bengali-language newspaper issued from Kolkata, India. It is the organ of the West Bengal State Council of the Communist Party of India. It was published as a weekly newspaper since 1965; 'Kalantar' converted to  a daily newspaper in the late 1960s. And have a separate weekly as it is. The header of the 'Kalantar' daily was designed by the legend film maker-artist Satyajit Ray himself. Among the early editors, veteran communist leader Somnath Lahiri, Bhabani Sen, Jyoti Dasgupta, Prabhat Dasgupta, Prof. Gautam Chattopadhyay were there. From the single-color edition it is now publishing as a four-color daily newspaper. In the autumn, Kalantar publish a festive 'Sharadiyo' edition in the book form as like as other daily newspapers in Kolkata.

References

Bengali-language newspapers published in India
Communist newspapers
Communist Party of India
Communist periodicals published in India
Newspapers established in 1965
1965 establishments in West Bengal
Newspapers published in Kolkata